Sydney A. Smith (August 31, 1883 – June 5, 1961) was an American professional baseball catcher. He played in Major League Baseball (MLB) for the Philadelphia Athletics and the St. Louis Browns in 1908, the Cleveland Naps from 1910 to 1911, and the Pittsburgh Pirates from 1914 to 1915. Smith was also the first head football coach at The Citadel, serving for one season, in 1905, and compiling a record of 2–3–1.

Smith later worked for the South Carolina Employment Security Commission. He retired to Camden, South Carolina and died on June 5, 1961, at a hospital in Orangeburg, South Carolina.

Head coaching record

Football

References

External links
 
 

1883 births
1961 deaths
Major League Baseball catchers
Philadelphia Athletics players
St. Louis Browns players
Cleveland Naps players
Pittsburgh Pirates players
Minor league baseball managers
Charleston Sea Gulls players
Atlanta Crackers players
Columbus Senators players
Shreveport Gassers players
South Carolina Gamecocks baseball coaches
South Carolina Gamecocks baseball players
Baseball players from South Carolina